Dora Meeson (1869–1955) was an Australian artist, suffragist, and an elected member of the Royal Institute of Oil Painters in London, England. She was a member of the British Artists' Suffrage League.

Early life and education 
Meeson was born in 1869 to John and Amelia Meeson (née Kipling) in Hawthorn, Victoria. Her father was the founder and headmaster of the Hawthorn Grammar School. The family emigrated to London in 1876, and following her father's admittance to the Bar, migrated to New Zealand c. 1879.

While studying at the Canterbury College School of Art, Meeson was witness to the suffrage movement and signed the petition which was forwarded to the New Zealand Parliament.

The family returned to Melbourne in 1895, enabling Meeson to study at the National Gallery School. While a student there, Meeson met her future husband, George Coates. Coates and Meeson both contended for a scholarship to study at the Académie Julian in Paris. Ultimately, Coates received the scholarship and Meeson did not, and her family financed her studies in Paris.

In 1903, Meeson and Coates were married in London, but had difficulties breaking into the art world there, and early on gained income through producing small illustrations for encyclopedias.

Career 
Meeson and Coates conducted their art careers in England. In 1903 they were employed as illustrators for the Encyclopedia Brittanica, together earning six pounds a year.  In 1921 they made a successful visit to Australia, and organised exhibitions of their works in Melbourne, Ballarat, Geelong, Adelaide and Perth.

Women's suffrage 
Following the death of her parents, Meeson gained momentum with the suffrage movement, and became a founding member of the Kensington branch of the Women's Freedom League.

In January 1907, the Artists' Suffrage League was established with Meeson an early member, making significant artistic contributions through her production of political posters, banners and postcards from the league's studio in The King's Road. She also illustrated booklets that were sold to increase visibility for the cause and promote awareness along with Cicely Hamilton, Mary Lowndes, and C. Hedley Charlton. Meeson's postcards were in high demand, with 6,488 sold at a penny each.

In May 1911 Vida Goldstein encouraged Meeson and others to form the Australian and New Zealand Women Voters' Committee (London), for the purpose of applying political pressure for voting rights and women's rights. 

On at 5:30pm on 17 June 1911, the Women's Suffrage Coronation Procession was held in London. Vida Goldstein, Margaret Fisher, and Emily McGowen led the Australian contingent with Meeson's banner, Commonwealth of Australia. "Trust the Women Mother as I have done" carried by Meeson and supported by her husband at the front of the Australian and New Zealand contingent. The banner was purchased from the Women's Library by the National Women's Consultative Council as a Bicentennial Gift to the Women of Australia. It can be viewed in Parliament House, Canberra.

Group exhibitions 
 1992 Heide Museum of Modern Art – Completing the Picture

Collections 
 Art Gallery of Ballarat
 Art Gallery of New South Wales
 Australian War Memorial
 Benalla Art Gallery
 Castlemaine Art Museum
 Christchurch Art Gallery New Zealand
 Art Gallery of New South Wales
 Imperial War Museum London
 Museum of London Docklands
 National Army Museum Chelsea
 National Gallery of Australia
 National Gallery of Victoria
 National Library of Australia
 Port of London Authority
 State Library of Tasmania

Recognition and legacy 

A representation of her banner was used on the design of the Australian 2003 dollar coin celebrating the centenary of women's suffrage.

Meeson Street in the Canberra suburb of Chisholm is named in her honour.

References

Further reading

External links 
 1913 Catalogue State Library of Victoria
 1921 Catalogue State Library of Victoria
 1934 Catalogue State Library of Victoria
 Australian suffragettes Australian Government
 Dora Meeson Coates Design & Art Australia Online
 
 Dora Meeson National Portrait Gallery, London
 Esther Peterson and two unidentified women standing in front of an Australian suffrage banner created by Dora Meeson Harvard University Library
 Nineteenth Century New Zealand Artists: A Guide & Handbook Victoria University of Wellington
 Suffrage artists’ league Woman and her Sphere
  Australian Dictionary of Biography
 

1869 births
1955 deaths
19th-century Australian painters
20th-century Australian painters
19th-century Australian women artists
20th-century Australian women artists
Académie Julian alumni
Alumni of the Slade School of Fine Art
Artists from Melbourne
Australian women painters
People from Hawthorn, Victoria